Grigoriy Pavlovich Chukhnin (1848 – 28 June 1906) was an officer of the Imperial Russian Navy during the late 19th and early 20th centuries. In 1904, when he was director of the Kuznetsov Naval Academy, he was nearly offered command of the Second Pacific Squadron before the command was ultimately given to Admiral Rozhestvensky. Rozhestvensky later requested his replacement by Chukhnin during the Pacific voyage, but was denied.  In late 1904, Chukhnin was appointed to command of the Black Sea Fleet. He commanded the Black Sea Fleet in 1905 during the mutiny on the battleship Potemkin. "Chukhnin had dealt cruelly with the sailors of the Red Battleship [the Potemkin]: four were shot, two hanged, several dozen were sent to hard labor[...] but he failed to instill terror in anyone, and succeeded only in intensifying the mutinous feelings within the navy."  In November 1905 he helped crush the Black Sea Fleet uprising. He was assassinated in July 1906, after an earlier attempt in February 1906 failed.

Notes
Citations

Sources 
 
 
 
 

Imperial Russian Navy admirals
1906 deaths
Russian military personnel of the Russo-Japanese War
1848 births
Military personnel from Mykolaiv
Recipients of the Order of St. Anna, 1st class
Officiers of the Légion d'honneur
Assassinated military personnel
Russian untitled nobility
Assassinations in Russia
Potemkin mutiny